Unheard Stories is a local history film exploring the history of deaf people in Wolverhampton. It was produced by Wolverhampton Arts and Museums. The project won the "Local History Project Award" at the 2008 Longman/History Today Awards.

References 
Wolverhampton
Deaf culture in the United Kingdom